Richard Henri Leduc (born August 24, 1951) is a Canadian former professional ice hockey player who played 130 games in the National Hockey League and 394 games in the World Hockey Association. He played for the Boston Bruins, Cleveland Crusaders, Cincinnati Stingers, Indianapolis Racers, and Quebec Nordiques between 1973 and 1980.

Honours
In 2012, he was inducted into the World Hockey Association Hall of Fame.

Career statistics

Regular season and playoffs

References

External links
 

1951 births
Living people
Boston Braves (AHL) players
Boston Bruins players
California Golden Seals draft picks
Canadian ice hockey centres
Cincinnati Stingers players
Cleveland Crusaders players
Ice hockey people from Quebec
Indianapolis Racers players
Oklahoma City Stars players
People from Montérégie
Quebec Nordiques (WHA) players
Quebec Nordiques players
Rochester Americans players
Trois-Rivières Ducs players